This is a list of the wings organised by the Royal Australian Air Force (RAAF).

Numbered wings

No. 1 Wing RAAF
No. 21 Wing RAAF
No. 22 Wing RAAF
No. 24 Wing RAAF
No. 34 Wing RAAF
No. 41 Wing RAAF
No. 42 Wing RAAF
No. 44 Wing RAAF
No. 61 Wing RAAF
No. 62 Wing RAAF
No. 71 Wing RAAF
No. 72 Wing RAAF
No. 73 Wing RAAF
No. 75 Wing RAAF
No. 76 Wing RAAF
No. 77 Wing RAAF
No. 78 Wing RAAF
No. 79 Wing RAAF
No. 80 Wing RAAF
No. 81 Wing RAAF
No. 82 Wing RAAF
No. 83 Wing RAAF
No. 84 Wing RAAF
No. 85 Wing RAAF
No. 86 Wing RAAF
No. 90 Wing RAAF
No. 91 Wing RAAF
No. 92 Wing RAAF
No. 95 Wing RAAF
No. 96 Wing RAAF
No. 97 Wing RAAF
No. 301 Air Base Wing RAAF
No. 302 Air Base Wing RAAF
No. 303 Air Base Wing RAAF
No. 304 Air Base Wing RAAF
No. 305 Air Base Wing RAAF
No. 306 Air Base Wing RAAF
No. 307 Air Base Wing RAAF
No. 321 Air Base Wing RAAF
No. 322 Air Base Wing RAAF
No. 323 Air Base Wing RAAF
No. 324 Air Base Wing RAAF (contingency unit, not permanently established)
No. 325 Air Base Wing RAAF (contingency unit, not permanently established)) 
No. 326 Air Base Wing RAAF (contingency unit, not permanently established)) 
No. 327 Air Base Wing RAAF (contingency unit, not permanently established)) 
No. 395 Expeditionary Combat Support Wing RAAF
No. 396 Expeditionary Combat Support Wing RAAF
No. 402 Wing RAAF
No. 481 Wing RAAF
No. 501 Wing RAAF
No. 503 Wing RAAF

Named wings

Airfield Defence Wing RAAF
Air System Development and Test Wing RAAF
Air Training Wing RAAF
Ground Training Wing RAAF
Health Services Wing RAAF
Information Warfare Directorate RAAF
INTERFET Combined Air Wing/No. 96 Combined Air Wing RAAF
Operational Support Wing RAAF
Reserve Training Wing RAAF
Search and Rescue Wing RAAF

See also

Structure of the Royal Australian Air Force

Notes

References
 
 

 
 

 
 
 

Australian Air Force wings
Air
Royal Australian Air Force lists